The Constitution of the United States gives Congress the authority to remove the president of the United States from office in two separate proceedings. The first one takes place in the House of Representatives, which impeaches the president by approving articles of impeachment through a simple majority vote. The second proceeding, the impeachment trial, takes place in the Senate. There, conviction on any of the articles requires a two-thirds majority vote and would result in the removal from office (if currently sitting), and possible debarment from holding future office.

Three United States presidents have been impeached, although none were convicted: Andrew Johnson was in 1868,  Bill Clinton was in 1998, and Donald Trump twice, in 2019 and 2021. Richard Nixon resigned as a result of the Watergate Scandal in 1974, after the House Judiciary Committee passed articles of impeachment but before the House could vote to impeach.

Many presidents have been subject to demands for impeachment by groups and individuals.

Procedure

Presidents who have been impeached

Andrew Johnson

President Andrew Johnson held open disagreements with Congress, who tried to remove him several times. The Tenure of Office Act was enacted over Johnson's veto to curb his power and he openly violated it in early 1868.

The House of Representatives adopted 11 articles of impeachment against Johnson.

Chief Justice Salmon P. Chase presided over Johnson's Senate trial. Conviction failed by one vote in May 1868. The impeachment trial remained a unique event for 130 years.

Bill Clinton

On October 8, 1998, the House of Representatives voted to launch an impeachment inquiry against President Bill Clinton, in part because of allegations that he lied under oath when being investigated in the Clinton–Lewinsky scandal.

On December 19, 1998, two articles of impeachment were approved by the House, charging Clinton with perjury and obstruction of justice. The charges stemmed from a sexual harassment lawsuit filed against Clinton by Arkansas state employee Paula Jones and from Clinton's testimony denying that he had engaged in a sexual relationship with White House intern Monica Lewinsky. They were:

Article I, charged Clinton with perjury. Article II, charged Clinton with obstruction of justice.

Chief Justice William Rehnquist presided over Clinton's Senate trial. Both articles of impeachment failed to receive the required super-majority, and so Clinton was acquitted and was not removed from office.

Donald Trump

First impeachment 

After a whistleblower accused President Donald Trump of pressuring a foreign government to interfere on Trump's behalf prior to the 2020 election, the House initiated an impeachment inquiry. On December 10, 2019, the Judiciary Committee approved two articles of impeachment (H.Res. 755): abuse of power and obstruction of Congress. On December 18, 2019, the House voted to impeach Trump on two charges:

Abuse of power by "pressuring Ukraine to investigate his political rivals ahead of the 2020 election while withholding a White House meeting and $400 million in U.S. security aid from Kyiv."
Obstruction of Congress by directing defiance of subpoenas issued by the House and ordering officials to refuse to testify.

On January 31, 2020, the Senate voted 51–49 against calling witnesses or issuing subpoenas for any additional documents. On February 5, 2020, the Senate found Trump not guilty of abuse of power, by a vote of 48–52, with Republican senator Mitt Romney being the only senator—and the first senator in U.S. history—to cross party lines by voting to convict, and not guilty of obstruction of Congress, by a vote of 47–53.

Chief Justice John Roberts presided over Trump's first trial. As both articles of impeachment failed to receive the required super-majority, Trump was acquitted and was not removed from office.

Second impeachment 

Trump was impeached for a second time after he was alleged to incite a deadly attack on the United States Capitol by attempting to overturn the 2020 presidential election results after his loss to Joe Biden. On January 13, 2021, the House voted to impeach Trump for "Incitement of Insurrection".

Although Trump's term ended on January 20, the trial in the Senate began on February 9. On February 13, the Senate found Trump not guilty of incitement of insurrection, by a vote of 57 for conviction and 43 against, below the 67 votes needed for a supermajority. In previous impeachment proceedings, only one senator had ever voted to convict a president of their own party. This time, seven Republican senators found Trump guilty, making it the most bipartisan impeachment trial.

As Trump was no longer president, the president pro tempore of the Senate Patrick Leahy presided over Trump's second trial. As the article of impeachment failed to receive the required super-majority, Trump was acquitted.

Table of impeachment trial results

President subjected to an impeachment process who resigned before it ended

Richard Nixon

The House Judiciary Committee approved three articles of impeachment against President Richard Nixon for obstruction of justice, abuse of power and contempt of Congress for his role in the Watergate scandal.

On October 20, 1973, Nixon ordered the firing of Special Prosecutor Archibald Cox, precipitating the Saturday Night Massacre. A massive reaction took place, especially in Congress, where 17 resolutions were introduced between November 1, 1973, and January 1974: H.Res. 625, H.Res. 635, H.Res. 643, H.Res. 648, H.Res. 649, H.Res. 650, H.Res. 652, H.Res. 661, H.Res. 666, H.Res. 686, H.Res. 692, H.Res. 703, H.Res. 513, H.Res. 631, H.Res. 638, and H.Res. 662. H.Res. 803, passed February 6, authorized a Judiciary Committee investigation, and in July, that committee approved three articles of impeachment.  Before the House took action, the impeachment proceedings against Nixon were mooted when Nixon resigned on August 9, 1974. A report containing articles of impeachment was accepted by the full House on August 20, 1974, by a vote of 412–3.

While Nixon wasn't formally impeached, this is the only impeachment process to result in the president leaving office. Nixon was pardoned by his successor, Gerald Ford.

Presidents who, after a formal investigation, were not impeached

James Buchanan
In 1860, the House of Representatives set up the United States House Select Committee to Investigate Alleged Corruptions in Government, known as the Covode Committee after its chairman, Rep. John Covode (R-PA), to investigate President James Buchanan on suspicion of bribery and other allegations. After about a year of hearings, the committee concluded that Buchanan's actions did not merit impeachment.

Andrew Johnson

On January 7, 1867, the House of Representatives voted to approve an impeachment inquiry run by the House Committee on the Judiciary, which initially ended in a June 3, 1867 vote by the committee to recommend against forwarding articles of impeachment to the full House. However, on November 25, 1867, the House Committee on the Judiciary, which had not previously forwarded the result of its inquiry to the full House, reversed their previous decision, and voted in a 5–4 vote to recommend impeachment proceedings, however, the full House rejected this recommendation by a 108–56 vote. Johnson would later, separately, be impeached in 1868.

Presidents whom the full House of Representatives voted against holding an impeachment inquiry into

Thomas Jefferson 
On January 25, 1809, Rep. Josiah Quincy III (a Federalist from Massachusetts) introduced resolutions which would launch an impeachment inquiry into President Thomas Jefferson, by then a lame duck who was scheduled to leave office on March 4, 1809. Quincy alleged that Jefferson had committed a "high misdemeanor" by keeping Benjamin Lincoln, the Port of Boston's customs collector, in that federal office, despite Lincoln's own protests that he was too old and too weak to continue with his job. In 1806, Lincoln had written Jefferson proposing his own resignation, but Jefferson requested that Lincoln continue in the office until he appointed a successor. Quincy argued that, by leaving Lincoln in the post, Jefferson had unfairly enabled a federal official to receive a $5,000 annual salary, "for doing no services".

The resolution received immediate resistance from both Federalists and Democratic-Republicans, and saw 17 members of the House speak against even providing consideration of the resolution. Quincy refused to withdraw his resolution, despite the immense opposition. Congressmen argued that the act of requesting Lincoln remain in office was not a high crime nor a misdemeanor, and there was not even evidence of inefficient management of the customs house. The House voted 93–24 to allow consideration of the resolution. After consideration, it was defeated by a vote of 117–1.

John Tyler
After President John Tyler vetoed a tariff bill in June 1842, a committee headed by former president John Quincy Adams, then a representative, condemned Tyler's use of the veto and stated that Tyler should be impeached. (This was not only a matter of the Whigs supporting the bank and tariff legislation which Tyler vetoed. Until the presidency of the Whigs' archenemy Andrew Jackson, presidents vetoed bills rarely, and then generally on constitutional rather than policy grounds, so Tyler's actions also went against the Whigs' concept of the presidency.) In August, the House accepted this report, which implied that impeachable offenses had been committed by Tyler, in a vote of 100–80.

Tyler criticized the House for, what he argued, was a vote effectively charging him with impeachable offenses without actually impeaching him of such offenses, thus denying him the ability to defend himself against these charges in a Senate trial.

Rep. John Botts (Whig-VA), who opposed President Tyler (who was a member of the same party Tyler had up until recently been a member of), introduced an impeachment resolution on July 10, 1842 that levied several charges against Tyler regarding his use of the presidential veto power and called for a nine-member committee to investigate his actions, with the expectation of a formal impeachment recommendation. The impeachment resolution was defeated in a 127–83 vote on January 10, 1843.

Presidents against whom impeachment resolutions were introduced, but no full-House vote was held

Ulysses S. Grant 
Rep. Joseph Clay Stiles Blackburn (D-KY) introduced an impeachment resolution against President Ulysses S. Grant in 1876, regarding the number of days Grant had been absent from the White House. The resolution never gained momentum and was tabled in December 1876.

Grover Cleveland 
Rep. Milford W. Howard (D-AL), on May 23, 1896, submitted a resolution (H.Res 374) impeaching President Grover Cleveland for selling unauthorized federal bonds and breaking the Pullman Strike. It was neither voted on nor referred to a committee.

Herbert Hoover 
During the 1932–33 lame duck session of Congress, on December 13, 1932 and on January 17, 1933, Rep. Louis Thomas McFadden (R-PA) introduced two impeachment resolutions against President Herbert Hoover, over economic grievances. The resolutions were read and then immediately tabled by overwhelming votes.

Harry S. Truman
In April 1951, President Harry S. Truman fired General of the Army Douglas MacArthur.  Congressional Republicans responded with numerous calls for Truman's removal. The Senate held hearings, and a year later, Representatives George H. Bender and Paul W. Shafer separately introduced House bills 607 and 614 against President Truman. The resolutions were referred to the Judiciary Committee but were not considered by the Democratic-held Senate.

On April 22, 1952, Rep. Noah M. Mason (R-IL) suggested that impeachment proceedings should be started against President Harry S. Truman for seizing the nation's steel mills. Soon after Mason's remarks, Rep. Robert Hale (R-ME) introduced a resolution (H.Res. 604). After three days of debate on the floor of the House, it was referred to the House Judiciary Committee, but no action was taken.

Ronald Reagan

In 1983, Representative Henry B. González was joined by Ted Weiss, John Conyers Jr., George Crockett Jr., Julian C. Dixon, Mervyn M. Dymally, Gus Savage and Parren J. Mitchell in proposing a resolution impeaching Reagan for "the high crime or misdemeanor of ordering the invasion of Grenada in violation of the Constitution of the United States, and other high crime or misdemeanor ancillary thereto."

On March 5, 1987, Rep. González (D-TX) introduced H.Res. 111, with six articles against President Ronald Reagan regarding the Iran-Contra affair to the House Judiciary Committee, where no further action was taken. While no further action was taken on this particular bill, it led directly to the joint hearings of the subject that dominated the news later that year. After the hearings were over, USA Today reported that articles of impeachment were discussed but decided against.

Edwin Meese acknowledged, in testimony at the trial of Reagan aide Oliver North, that officials in the Reagan administration had been worried that the 1987 impeachment could result in Reagan having to resign.

George H.W. Bush 
President George H. W. Bush was subject to two resolutions over the Gulf War in 1991, both by Rep. Henry B. González (D-TX). H.Res. 34 was introduced on January 16, 1991, and was referred to the House Committee on Judiciary and then its Subcommittee on Economic and Commercial Law on March 18, 1992. H.Res. 86 was introduced on February 21, 1991, and referred to the House Judiciary Committee, where no further action was taken on it.

George W. Bush 

During the administration of President George W. Bush, several American politicians sought to either investigate him for possible impeachable offenses or to bring actual impeachment charges. The most significant of these occurred on June 10, 2008, when Rep. Dennis Kucinich (D-OH) and Rep. Robert Wexler (D-FL) introduced H.Res. 1258, containing 35 articles of impeachment against Bush. After nearly a day of debate, the House voted 251–166 to refer the impeachment resolution to the House Judiciary Committee on June 11, 2008, where no further action was taken on it.

Joe Biden

On January 21, 2021, the day after the inauguration of Joe Biden, Rep. Marjorie Taylor Greene (R-GA) filed articles of impeachment against President Biden. She cited abusing his power while serving as vice president. Her articles of impeachment claimed that Viktor Shokin was investigating the founder of Burisma Holdings, a natural gas giant in Ukraine. Biden's son Hunter Biden had served as a member of the board since 2014. However, Shokin was not investigating the company. There is no concrete evidence that suggests Biden had pressured Ukraine to benefit his son.

In June 2021, Donald Trump expressed interest in running for a House of Representatives seat in Florida in the 2022 midterm elections, getting himself elected Speaker of the House, and then beginning an impeachment inquiry against President Biden.

Following the withdrawal of American military forces from Afghanistan, the Fall of Kabul on August 15, 2021, and the subsequent attack on Kabul's airport, several Republicans, including Representative Greene, Lauren Boebert, Ronny Jackson, and especially Senators Rick Scott and Lindsey Graham, called for either the stripping of powers and duties (via the 25th Amendment) or removal from office (via impeachment) of Joe Biden if Americans and allies were left behind and held hostage in Afghanistan by the Taliban. House Minority Leader Kevin McCarthy pledged a “day of reckoning” against Biden.  Some Republicans, including Josh Hawley and Marsha Blackburn, called for Vice President Kamala Harris and Biden’s other Cabinet officials to be removed as well. Mitch McConnell did not call for an impeachment inquiry against Biden, however, as Republicans do not have the majority in either the house or senate.

In January 2022, Senator Ted Cruz (R-TX) predicted that if Republicans win control of the U.S. House of Representatives in the 2022 United States House of Representatives elections, they are likely to move to impeach Biden "whether it's justified or not". In August 2022, The Hill reported that impeaching Biden was "a top priority" for House Republicans, should they win control of that body in the 2022 mid-term elections.

Others

Lyndon B. Johnson 
On May 3, 1968, a petition to impeach President Lyndon B. Johnson for "military and political duplicity" was referred to the House Judiciary Committee. No action was taken.

Barack Obama 

On December 3, 2013, the House Judiciary Committee held a hearing on President Barack Obama that was formally titled "The President's Constitutional Duty to Faithfully Execute the Laws," which political journalists viewed as an attempt to begin justifying impeachment proceedings. When asked by reporters if this was a hearing about impeachment, Rep. Lamar Smith (R-TX) claimed that it was not, saying "I didn't mention impeachment nor did any of the witnesses in response to my questions at the Judiciary Committee hearing." One witness did mention impeachment directly: Georgetown University law professor Nicholas Quinn Rosenkranz said "a check on executive lawlessness is impeachment" as he accused Obama of "claim[ing] the right of the king to essentially stand above the law." Impeachment efforts never advanced past this, making Obama the first president in 28 years never to have articles of impeachment against him referred to the House Judiciary Committee during his tenure.

See also
 List of efforts to impeach vice presidents of the United States
 List of impeachment investigations of United States federal officials
 List of impeachments of heads of state

References

Articles containing video clips
Impeach
Presidential impeachment in the United States
United States presidential history